Bol Bachchan is a 2012 Indian Hindi-language action comedy film directed by Rohit Shetty and produced by Ajay Devgn & Dhillin Mehta under Ajay Devgn FFilms and Shree Ashtavinayak Cine Vision Limited respectively, with Fox Star Studios serving as distributor and presenter. Based on a script by writers Yunus Sajwal and Farhad-Sajid and a story by Shetty, it stars Abhishek Bachchan as the titular character, with Ajay Devgn, Asin, Prachi Desai, Krushna Abhishek, Neeraj Vora and Archana Puran Singh, and is loosely based on the 1979 Hrishikesh Mukherjee classic Gol Maal. It is also Abhishek and Ajay's third collaboration after Zameen and Yuva.

Himesh Reshammiya composed the film's soundtrack with Ajay–Atul as guest composers on a dance number, with Amar Mohile composing the score.
The trailer was launched on 24 May 2012. The film marks the last collaboration between Shetty and Vora, as the latter died 5 years after the film's release.

Earning over  net from domestic markets and more than  worldwide, Bol Bachchan became a critical and commercial success and was remade in Telugu as Masala in 2013.

Plot
Abbas Ali "Abhishek Bachchan" lives in Delhi with his sister Sania. When their ancestral property is taken from them by deception, Abbas loses his job. Their father's family friend, Shastri, convinces them to move to his village, Ranakpur, where he assures Abbas that he will get him a job at his boss Prithviraj Raghuvanshi's place. Prithviraj is a powerful and kindhearted man who hates liars and punishes them harshly. Abbas and Sania arrive at Ranakpur and meet Abbas's friend and Shastri's son Ravi who runs a drama company with his friends. Abbas learns that there is a temple at the border of Ranakpur and Kherwada, the village where Prithviraj's cousin and archenemy Vikrant Raghuvanshi hold sway. The temple, being at the border of the two villages, is a disputed property and has been locked up for years. The long-standing enmity between the cousins even goes on to disrupt the construction of a power plant project in Ranakpur.

The plot begins when a child falls into the well of the temple and Abbas breaks the temple's lock to save the child. When Prithviraj arrives at the scene, Ravi tells him that Abbas's name is Abhishek Bachchan to avoid any religious tensions that might result from the fact that a Muslim broke into a Hindu temple. Prithviraj hires Abhishek Bachchan (Abbas) and becomes very happy with his work. Soon, Ravi and his friends have to devise a new plan when Prithviraj spots Abbas celebrating Eid and wearing the traditional garb of a Muslim. Abbas and the others convince Prithviraj that the one celebrating Eid was actually Abhishek's twin brother, from another mother, 'Abbas', an effeminate man and classical Kathak dancer. Things get worse for Abbas and Ravi when Prithviraj kindly hires Abbas to teach Kathak to his sister Radhika. Abbas tells Radhika the truth, who promises to keep it a secret. Prithviraj's sidekick Maakhan suspects Abbas when he sees him watching Gol Maal because the movie has many similarities with the drama Abbas is playing. However, Abbas manages to escape from the suspicion when Prithviraj beats Maakhan for trying to remove Abbas's mustache. Prithviraj notices that Abbas (the dancer) is in love with Radhika. Prithviraj teams with Abhishek (unknowing that he is also Abbas) to find Abbas when Radhika is missing, who is in fact kidnapped by Vikrant and the duo saves her. Impressed by Abhishek, Prithviraj fixes his marriage with Radhika and Prithviraj's marriage with Sania, as she resembles his late love, Apeksa, who died in an accident four years ago. But at last, when Abbas decides to reveal the truth, Prithviraj learns the truth from Maakhan, and presents it in a stage play. In a madly chase, Prithviraj gets on the edge of a mountain and Abbas almost falls while trying to save his life. At last, Abbas explains his situation and promises never to lie again.

Cast
 Abhishek Bachchan as Abbas Ali / Abhishek Bachchan (Fake Name)
 Ajay Devgn as Prithviraj Raghuvanshi
 Asin as Sania Ali / Sania Bachchan ? Apeksa
 Prachi Desai as Radhika Raghuvanshi, Prithvi's sister
 Archana Puran Singh as Zohra / Madhumati
 Krushna Abhishek as Ravi Shastri
 Asrani as Shastri
 Paresh Ganatra as Builder 
 Neeraj Vora as Maakhan
 Vijay Ishwarlal Pawar as Kailash
 Prasad Barve as Ravi's friend
 Jeetu Verma as Vikrant Raghuvanshi, Prithvi's Cousin brother
 Robin Bhatt as Judge
 Krishna Shetty as Radhika Raghuvanshi's college friend.
 Amitabh Bachchan as himself in the title song "Bol Bachchan"
 Noushaad Abbas as Prithviraj's Henchmen

Comparisons with Gol Maal
The plot and the characters of the film are based on the 1979 comedy film Gol Maal.

Production
The film was originally expected for a Diwali 2011 release, though was postponed to 2012. On Dussehra 2011, director Rohit Shetty who previously directed the comedy flick, Golmaal 3 (2010), did first give actor Ajay Devgn an offer for Golmaal 4, but Devgn claimed "Golmaal 4 will happen next to next year. It's necessary to have two years gap between the two Golmaal films. It's not good if it comes every year." After the announcement, it was added that Bol Bachchan will be made before Golmaal 4. In January 2011, it was revealed that actress Asin was roped in for the first female lead after Bipasha Basu rejected the role. Earlier, actress Genelia D'Souza was signed to play the second female lead, but due to her differences with the makers, she opted out of the project and hence the role was offered to Prachi Desai.

In Jubilee Comedy Circus, Krushna Abhishek did a performance of Rohit Shetty never giving him a film role to do but having promised him in earlier seasons of the show, Rohit was so impressed by the performance, he decided to give Krushna a role in Bol Bachchan. Shetty also added co-host Archana Puran Singh from the same show to the film cast. It was revealed in the 300th episode special of Comedy Circus, where Rohit Shetty was a guest judge, that Paresh Ganatra was among the cast. The film has been shot at various locations, including Rohit Shetty's seemingly favourite Panchgani and Chomu Palace, among other locations.

Soundtrack

The music of the film was composed by Himesh Reshammiya, while the lyrics were penned by Sajid-Farhad, Shabbir Ahmed, Swanand Kirkire and Sameer. The album was released on 7 June 2012 and included four original soundtracks along with four remix versions of the tracks. Three songs were composed by Reshammiya, of which two were featured in the film and one was listed only in the album. One song, "Nach Le Nach Le", composed by Ajay–Atul was also included in the album. Among the songs, "Jab Se Dekhi Hai" and "Nach Le Nach Le" became moderately popular.

Release
Bol Bachchan was released on 6 July 2012 in 2575 screens in India. Upon release, the film received mixed critical response, but strong box office collections by the end of its first weekend. On the review aggregator website Top10Bollywood, the film scored 2.31, based on 34 reviews.

Reception

Critical response

On the positive side, Taran Adarsh of Bollywood Hungama gave the film 4 out of 5 stars and said, "On the whole, Bol Bachchan is a dhamaal entertainer that has the Rohit Shetty stamp all over it. A film that pays homage to the cinema of the 1970s and 1980s, especially the ones made by Manmohan Desai. Big stars, big visuals, big entertainment, Bol Bachchan has it all." Devesh Sharma of Filmfare also awarded the film 4 out of 5 stars and commented, "How we wish director Rohit Shetty had kept aside his passion of blowing up vehicles wholescale just this once. The exaggerated action scenes eat into the narrative and jar the pace. Would this film be a crowd pleaser– well yes. It's a good leave-your-brains-behind product that Shetty is famous for. There are flashes that suggest he could have gone beyond and made a more polished film but the lure of making a blockbuster proved too much, I guess. The masses would be happy but the same can't be said for the soul of Hrishikesh Mukherjee." Srijana Mitra Das of Times of India gave the film 3.5 out of 5 stars and stated, "Rohit Shetty's latest movie has a constant up-and-down aspect to it, one sequence making you shriek in your seat with laughter, another sending your mind wandering off to the mundane. But at the very heart of things Shetty's madly in love with the movies and BB is his homage to that all-time classic, Golmaal." Mrigank Dhaniwala of Koimoi also gave the film 3.5 out of 5 stars and concluded, "On the whole, Bol Bachchan delivers entertainment in huge dollops. For that, it will earn the love of the paying public and will have a successful run at the box-office." Gaurav Malani of Times of India gave the film a positive feedback and said, "For a (pleasant) change, Rohit Shetty doesn't do Golmaal 'his' style. Rather he does Golmaal in its 'original' form and that's what creates a decent difference, making Bol Bachchan fairly entertaining!".

Sukanya Verma of Rediff gave the film 2.5 out of 5 stars and stated, "Bol Bachchan is dispensable cinema, forgotten almost immediately after it's over. What I kept wondering is how does Asrani who acted in Mukerjee's acclaimed films like Chupke Chupke (1975), Abhimaan (1973) and Bawarchi (1972) feel about working in the remake of a film where the hero wore his kurta. Don't know what I'm talking about? You deserve Bol Bachchan. But if you do, you must have already begun scouting for your copy of Gol Maal somewhere." Shubhra Gupta of The Indian Express gave the film 2.5 out of 5 stars and commented, "If your nosy is not turned up too high, Bol Bachchan, less blaring than your standard Rohit Shetty comedy, can give you sporadic chuckles, and a few helpless laughs. Can't expect more." Vinayak Chakravorthy of India Today gave the film 2.5 out of 5 stars and concluded, "Far from being LOL stuff, Bol Bachchan ends up being Bore Bachchan, with a lame climax."

The film received some negative reviews. Rajeev Masand of CNN-IBN gave the film 2 out of 5 stars and said, "Even if you're a fan of Rohit Shetty's cinema, it's unlikely your chest will become a blouse over this one!" Blessy Chettiar of DNA India gave the film 2 out of 5 stars and commented, "If you liked the Shetty Golmaals and Singham, this review will only be bol bachchan for you. Have fun while it lasts." Ananya Bhattacharya of Zee News gave the film and said, "They say what can't be cured, must be endured. Once you give in to that adage and ask your white matter to exit the theatre, you will enjoy the film. Watch 'Bol Bachchan' just for laughing." Aniruddha Guha of DNA India gave the film 2 out of 5 stars and stated, "Bol Bachchan, overall, falls short of being a laugh riot in spite of having the ammunition for it. In its current form, it's best enjoyed inebriated." Anupama Chopra of Hindustan Times gave the film 2 out of 5 stars and said, "There is no attempt at plotting, storytelling, delineating a character, building coherence or following logic. Shetty’s only agenda is to give you a good time." Saibal Chatterjee of NDTV gave the film 1.5 out of 5 stars and concluded that "Bol Bachchan is a comedy so absurd that it could reduce you to tears of despair. Conversely, if you have the stomach for such rampant silliness, it might propel you into paroxysms of delight. The call is entirely yours." Kunal Guha of Yahoo! India rated the movie 1 out of 5 stars and said, "Bol Bachchan (BB) jams chopsticks up the nose of Hrishikesh Mukherjee's comic classic Gol Maal and digs itself six feet under with it. While the story is the same in theory, being a Rohit Shetty film only adds some cars nailing somersaults, trucks attempting a ballet, baddies playing mid-air Garba after being biffed and Ajay Devgn drawing his eyebrows close enough to show that he means business."

Awards and nominations

Box office

India
Bol Bachchan opened better at single screens as compared to multiplexes. Single screens on average opened to around 70% mark while multiplexes were more closer to the 60% mark. Bol Bachchan collected around  nett on its first day. Bol Bachchan had a good jump on Sunday as it grossed around  nett for a  nett weekend. The film collected  on Monday. Bol Bachchan has come into its own on Tuesday with strong collections of around  nett and a total of  nett in five days. Bol Bachchan has had a good first week and collected  nett. The first week collections of Bol Bachchan are better than Singham but less than Golmaal 3. Bol Bachchan collected around  nett on its second Friday. It is a 70% drop from its first day as multiplex business was hit by the new release Cocktail but single screen business remained good. The film has collected around  nett in eight days. Bol Bachchan crossed the  nett mark in ten days as it grossed  nett approx over the weekend. Bol Bachchan grossed around  nett in its second week taking its two-week total to  nett. Bol Bachchan had grossed  at the end of its run in domestic market.

Overseas
Bol Bachchan had a decent opening overseas of around $2 million. UAE was good as comedy films do better in that market. Bol Bachchan has grossed  in 17 days. Finally, the film netted US$4 million overseas.

See also
 List of highest-grossing Bollywood films

References

External links
 

Ajay Devgn
2010s Hindi-language films
2012 films
Films directed by Rohit Shetty
2012 action comedy films
Indian action comedy films
Films scored by Himesh Reshammiya
Films scored by Ajay–Atul
Fox Star Studios films
Hindi films remade in other languages
2012 comedy films
Remakes of Indian films